Raymond Lebreton (29 September 1941 – 6 August 2022) was a French racing cyclist. He rode in the 1966 Tour de France.
He died on 6 August 2022, at the age of 80.

References

1941 births
2022 deaths
French male cyclists
Sportspeople from Calvados (department)